Thomas "Tom" Canty is a fictitious character from Mark Twain's 1881 novel The Prince and the Pauper. He was born the same day as Edward Tudor, the Prince of Wales in 1537 and grew up in a life of poverty with his abusive, alcoholic father and grandmother. His mother and his sisters always tried to protect him. He was well educated and learned Latin from Father Andrew, a local priest. One day, while taking a stroll, he meets Edward. They exchange clothes with one another, and then due to a mistake, it is assumed that Tom is the Prince of Wales, not Edward. When King Henry VIII died, Edward was to be crowned King, however Tom was crowned instead.

Tom was about to be crowned king when Edward comes in and proves that he is the rightful King by knowing where the Great Seal of England was, having hidden it just after they had switched clothes.

Edward is crowned King Edward VI of England, and names Tom his royal ward. The end of the book mentions that Tom lived to be a very old man, whereas Edward tragically died at the age of 15.

References

Literary characters introduced in 1881
Mark Twain characters
Fictional people from London
Child characters in literature